Tróndur is a Faroese masculine given name and may refer to:
Tróndur Bogason (born 1976), Faroese composer and musician
Tróndur í Gøtu (c. 945– 1035), Faroese Viking 
Tróndur Patursson (born 1944), Faroese painter, sculptor, glass artist and adventurer

Faroese masculine given names